The 2017 Melon Music Awards ceremony, organized by kakao M (a kakao company) through its online music store, Melon, took place on December 2, 2017, at the Gocheok Sky Dome in Seoul, South Korea. This was the ninth ceremony in the show's history.

Performers and presenters 
The following individuals and groups, listed in order of appearance, presented awards or performed musical numbers.

Performers

Presenters

Judging criteria

Winners and nominees 
Only artists who released music between November 20, 2016, and October 25, 2017, were eligible, and the nominees were selected by calculating the number of downloads, streams, and weekly Melon Popularity Award votes achieved by each artist.

Winners are listed first and highlighted in boldface. Voting for Top 10 Artists took place on the Melon Music website from October 26 through November 12, 2017. Voting for Category awards took place from November 13 through December 1, 2017.

Voted Awards

Other awards

Gallery

References

External links 

2017 music awards
Melon Music Awards ceremonies
Annual events in South Korea